The Galikoma massacre was an indiscriminate killing of civilians perpetrated by the Tigray Defense Forces (TDF) in the village of Galikoma (or Galicoma) in the Afar Region of Ethiopia during the Tigray War, on 5 August 2021. Galikoma is a village in the Gulina district of Fanti zone in Afar Region.

Background

Massacre
An Ethiopian Human Rights Commission investigation found that on the morning of 5 August 2021, the TDF indiscriminately killed 107 civilians, including 27 children, and injured 35 civilians during an offensive in Galikoma. Civilians were assaulted by artillery and gunfire. According to Afar regional authorities, more than 200 civilians, including 107 children, were killed by the TDF. Survivors told hospital officials that they were shot by TDF fighters.

See also 
Murders and massacres in the Tigray War
Timeline of the Tigray War (July 2021-present)

References 

2021 massacres of the Tigray War
August 2021 crimes in Africa
Massacres committed by the Tigray Defense Forces